Pavithra is a 1994 Indian Tamil-language drama film written, produced and directed by K. Subash under his home banner, Dhanooja Films. The film stars Raadhika, Nassar, Ajith Kumar and Keerthana. It was released on 2 November 1994, Diwali day, and won two National Film Awards: Best Male Playback Singer (P. Unnikrishnan) and Best Lyrics (Vairamuthu).

Plot 

Ashok is a cancer patient, and Pavithra is a nurse in the hospital where he is being treated. Since Ashok's age is same as her child (which was stillborn, and she is childless), Pavithra showers maternal affection on him, which her husband Raghunathan "Raghu" mistakes as something else because of Nambiar, a rogue doctor. Confusion ensues, and Pavithra misunderstands Ashok. In the end, Ashok dies and Pavithra adopts a baby as her own child.

Cast 
Raadhika as Pavithra
Nassar as Raghunathan "Raghu"
Ajith Kumar as Ashok
Keerthana as Chitra
S. S. Chandran as Raghu's neighbour
Vadivelu as Thenmozhi's husband
Kovai Sarala as Thenmozhi
Disco Shanti as Shiba
Junior Balaiah
Kitty as Dr. Nambiar
Kaka Radhakrishnan as Subbu's grandfather
R. S. Shivaji as Subbu
Loose Mohan as Rickshaw driver

Production 
Ajith's voice was dubbed for by Sekar.

Soundtrack 
The soundtrack was composed by A. R. Rahman. The song "Sevvaanam" is based on "Mamboove" from the Malayalam film Yoddha (1992). The song "Uyirum Neeyae" is set in the Carnatic raga Khamas.

Release and reception 
Pavithra was released on 2 November 1994, Diwali day. Malini Mannath of The Indian Express said, "The writer-director should be commended for giving importance to the story line and the scenes in some places are really touching. But certain crucial episodes have been shoddily treated". K. Vijiyan of New Straits Times said the story, though unusual to Tamil cinema, was not well developed or brought across effectively, and "The director's inexperience in tackling sentimental subjects shows. Radhika may be a good actress but she needs a good director". Thulasi of Kalki applauded the performances of Raadhika and Nassar, the music by Rahman and the cinematography, but criticised the inclusion of a dance sequence. The film went on to win two National Film Awards: Best Male Playback Singer (Unnikrishnan) and Best Lyrics (Vairamuthu). Furthermore, the film won third prize in the Tamil Nadu State Film Award for Best Film winners list. According to Ajith, the film changed the course of his life "to a certain extent".

References

External links 

1990s Tamil-language films
1994 drama films
1994 films
Films directed by K. Subash
Films scored by A. R. Rahman
Films set in Chennai
Films set in hospitals
Indian drama films